= Gran DT =

Gran DT is a competition organized by the Clarín (Argentine newspaper), in which the reader puts together a team of 15 players (11 players and 4 alternates) from all players in the Argentine first division, earning points based on scores for which the newspaper describes the actions of those in the meetings of each respective date of the championship. It was created in 1995 and held for several years, which was played over three million readers diario.1 The game was re-launched August 17, 2008. The game is based on the London game "Football Dreams" but with several modifications.

The site of El Gran DT is the second most visited sports site in Argentina, surpassed only by the sports daily online Ole.com.ar. This was demonstrated by comScore, Inc., a leader in measuring the digital world, who published a study on the online sports category in Argentina based on data from comScore Media Metrix service. The study found that Argentina is in tenth place in the world market in percentage terms of scope of sports, with over half the country's online users visiting a sports destination in May 2011.
